"The Way I Am" is a song written by Sonny Throckmorton, and recorded by American country music artist Merle Haggard.  It was released in March 1980 as the first single and title track from his album The Way I Am. The song reached number 2 on the Billboard Hot Country Singles chart and number 1 on the RPM Country Tracks chart in Canada.

Charts

Weekly charts

Year-end charts

Cover versions

 Alan Jackson recorded a version of the song on his 1999 album Under the Influence.
 Willy Mason recorded the song in 2006 on Australian radio station Triple J's Like a Version segment.
 Bonnie 'Prince' Billy recorded the song on his 2007 album Ask Forgiveness.
 Watermelon Slim recorded the song on his 2009 album Escape from the Chickencoop.
 Cody Jinks recorded the song for his 2016 album I'm Not the Devil.

References

1980 singles
1980 songs
Merle Haggard songs
Alan Jackson songs
Songs written by Sonny Throckmorton
MCA Records singles
Arista Nashville singles